Vistan or Veyestan or Wistan may refer to:
 Vistən, Azerbaijan
 Vistan-e Bala, Iran
 Vistan-e Pain, Iran